Stephen Morgan Leach (born January 16, 1966) is an American ice hockey coach and former professional ice hockey player. He is currently the head coach of the Valley Jr. Warriors '99 Elite squad. He is the uncle of Jay Leach.

Playing career
As a youth, Leach played in the 1979 Quebec International Pee-Wee Hockey Tournament with the Boston Braves minor ice hockey team.

Leach was raised in Lexington, Massachusetts and played his high school hockey at Matignon High School, where he transferred to as a sophomore. He won three consecutive Massachusetts HS hockey titles from 1982 to 1984. His older brother Chris played D1 hockey at St. Lawrence. Selected by the Washington Capitals in the second round of the 1984 NHL Draft, Leach played for the Capitals for parts of six seasons. It was during his time with the Capitals that he would also be a member of the U.S. Olympic Hockey Team that participated in the 1988 Winter Olympic Games.

Prior to the 1991–92 NHL season Leach was traded to the Boston Bruins in exchange for Randy Burridge. He would also play for the St. Louis Blues, Carolina Hurricanes, Ottawa Senators, Phoenix Coyotes, and Pittsburgh Penguins before retiring in 2000.

Career statistics

Regular season and playoffs

International

Awards and honors

References

External links

Profile at hockeydraftcentral.com

1966 births
Living people
American men's ice hockey right wingers
Binghamton Whalers players
Boston Bruins players
Calgary Flames scouts
Carolina Hurricanes players
Chicago Blackhawks scouts
Ice hockey coaches from Massachusetts
Ice hockey players at the 1988 Winter Olympics
Louisville Panthers players
New Hampshire Wildcats men's ice hockey players
Olympic ice hockey players of the United States
Ottawa Senators players
People from Lexington, Massachusetts
Philadelphia Flyers scouts
Phoenix Coyotes players
Pittsburgh Penguins players
St. Louis Blues players
Sportspeople from Middlesex County, Massachusetts
Springfield Falcons players
Washington Capitals draft picks
Washington Capitals players
Wilkes-Barre/Scranton Penguins players
Ice hockey people from Massachusetts
Ice hockey players from Massachusetts